All Saints Church, Haggerston, also Church of All Saints, is an Anglican church in Livermere Road, near the junction with Haggerston Road, in Haggerston in London Borough of Hackney, east London. It is part of a parish with Holy Trinity Church and St Philip Dalston (demolished after bombing in World War II).

History and design
All Saints was designed in the Gothic style by Philip Hardwick – best known as architect of the now demolished Euston Arch and the original Birmingham Curzon Street.

Constructed of Kentish rag with ashlar dressings, it was built between 1855–56. The church was extended by T.E. Knightley, probably in the early 1860s and due to growth in the congregation, with aisles remodelled and galleries added.

It has been extensively repaired, first following a fire and then war damage. Inside, the church is plastered and painted and its Grade II listing notes that the interior is: “curiously old-fashioned for its date and survives remarkably completely”.

The church today
Today, All Saints is part of Albion Square Conservation Area, along with neighbouring residential properties, Albion Square itself and Stonebridge Common.

From 1998 to 2014, the vicar was the Revd Rose Hudson-Wilkin, who also held the roles of Speaker’s chaplain to the House of Commons, priest vicar at Westminster Abbey and chaplain to the Queen Elizabeth II.

References

External links
All Saints description, A Church Near You
Albion Square Residents’ Association homepage, showing church and some nearby buildings

Church of England church buildings in the London Borough of Hackney
Grade II listed churches in London
Churches completed in 1856
19th-century Church of England church buildings
Victorian architecture in England
Diocese of London
1856 establishments in England
Haggerston